The 2018 FIM Moto2 World Championship was a part of the 70th F.I.M. Road Racing World Championship season.
Franco Morbidelli was the reigning series champion, but he did not defend his title as he moved to the MotoGP class.

2018 was the final season that the Honda CBR600RR inline-4 engine package — which debuted in the 2010 Moto2 season — was used in competition; as the brand new engine package (765cc inline-3) supplied by Triumph Motorcycles was introduced for the 2019 season.

After finishing 3rd at Sepang, Italian rider Francesco Bagnaia became the 2018 Moto2 World Champion. Miguel Oliveira finished second in the championship and his teammate Brad Binder finished third.

Teams and riders

All the bikes used series-specified Dunlop tyres and Honda 600cc 4-cylinder engine.

Rider changes
 Sam Lowes returned to Moto2 after a season with Aprilia Racing Team Gresini in MotoGP. Lowes previously raced in Moto2 from 2014 to 2016. He joined Swiss Innovative Investors, replacing the spot vacated by Thomas Lüthi who moved up to MotoGP with EG 0,0 Marc VDS.
 2017 Moto3 champion Joan Mir moved up to Moto2 with EG 0,0 Marc VDS, filling the spot vacated by reigning Moto2 champion Franco Morbidelli who moved up to MotoGP.
 Romano Fenati moved up to Moto2 along with his Moto3 team Marinelli Rivacold Snipers for the 2018 season.
 Xavi Vierge switched team from Tech 3 to Dynavolt Intact GP, replacing Sandro Cortese who left Moto2 for Supersport World Championship. Bo Bendsneyder moved up to Moto2 to fill his spot in Tech 3.
 Luca Marini and Stefano Manzi swapped teams for the 2018 season, with Marini joining his half-brother Valentino Rossi's team Sky Racing Team VR46 while Manzi joins Forward Racing for the 2018 season.
 Héctor Barberá returned to the intermediate class to join Pons HP40 along with Lorenzo Baldassarri, who switched team from Forward to Pons. Barbera previously competed with Pons Racing in the 2009 250cc season.
 Joe Roberts joined RW Racing GP after AGR Team folded near the end of the 2017 season. He joined by Steven Odendaal, who returned to the series after he last competed full-time in Moto2 in 2013.
 Federico Fuligni made his Moto2 full-time debut with Tasca Racing Scuderia Moto2, replacing Xavier Siméon who moved up to MotoGP with Avintia Racing.
 Danny Kent made his full-time Moto2 return in 2018 after leaving Kiefer Racing early in the 2017 season, joining Speed Up Racing as a replacement for Simone Corsi who switched team to Tasca Racing Scuderia Moto2.
 Tetsuta Nagashima switched team to Idemitsu Honda Team Asia, replacing Takaaki Nakagami who moved up to MotoGP to join LCR Honda in 2018.
 Axel Pons moved up to MotoGP as a factory test rider.
 Fabio Quartararo joined Speed Up Racing, replacing Augusto Fernández.
 Jules Danilo moved up to Moto2 with SAG Racing Team as a teammate to Isaac Viñales.
 2017 CEV Moto2 winner Eric Granado returned to Moto2, joining Forward Racing as a replacement for Lorenzo Baldassarri. Granado previously made some Moto2 appearances in the 2012 season.
 Zulfahmi Khairuddin moved from World Supersport to Moto2, rejoining the SIC Racing Team, who he previously rode for in Moto3 in 2015. He replaced the previously announced new signing Hafizh Syahrin, who moved up to MotoGP with Tech 3 to replace Jonas Folger.

Mid-season changes
 Dominique Aegerter missed both the Spanish Grand Prix and the French Grand Prix due to an Enduro crash in which he broke his pelvis. He was replaced by the German Lukas Tulovic who made his World Championship début.
 Remy Gardner missed the races at Jerez, Le Mans and Mugello due to injury, breaking both his legs and his ankle, he was replaced by the Spaniard Héctor Garzó.
 Zulfahmi Khairuddin left SIC Racing Team after the Jerez Grand Prix due to bad results. He was replaced by Niki Tuuli from the French Grand Prix onwards, who left the Supersport World Championship to join SIC Racing Team for the remainder of the season.
 Héctor Barberá left Pons HP40 after his contract was terminated by mutual agreement due to drunk driving. He was replaced by Augusto Fernández for the remainder of the season.
 Eric Granado left Forward Racing after the Czech Republic motorcycle Grand Prix. He was replaced by Isaac Viñales from the Austrian Grand Prix onwards, who left the SAG Team to join Forward Racing for the remainder of the season.
 At the San Marino Grand Prix, Romano Fenati received a 2-race ban following a very controversial incident where Fenati grabbed Stefano Manzi's brake lever at speed in retaliation for Manzi pushing him wide earlier during the race. The following day, Marinelli Rivacold Snipers announced that they terminated Fenati's contract as a result of the incident. Xavi Cardelús would replace Fenati in the team for the remainder of the season.
 Danny Kent was fired from Speed Up Racing after the Aragon Grand Prix due to ongoing bad results. Edgar Pons would become his replacement for the remainder of the season.
 Bo Bendsneyder suffered a broken tibia at the Japanese Grand Prix, and he was replaced by Bryan Staring in Phillip Island, Dimas Ekky Pratama in Sepang, and Héctor Garzó in Valencia.

Team changes
 NTS made their full season debut in Moto2, having previously competed as a wildcard constructor between the 2014 and 2017 seasons. They will field bikes for RW Racing GP, who switched manufacturer from Kalex to NTS. RW Racing GP also expands its operation to field two bikes for the 2018 season.
 Forward Racing Team and Dynavolt Intact GP switched manufacturers. Forward returned to Suter, with which they last competed in 2012, while Intact GP returned to Kalex after one season with Suter.
 Tasca Racing Scuderia Moto2 expanded to two bikes in 2018.
 Both CGBM Evolution and Kiefer Racing switched manufacturers from Kalex and Suter to KTM.
 Marinelli Rivacold Snipers expanded to Moto2, fielding a Kalex bike.
 AGR Team folded its operations in both Moto2 and Moto3 following the 2017 Aragon GP due to financial issues coupled with poor performance throughout the 2017 season.
 Petronas and the Sepang International Circuit will form a partnership which will enable the SIC Racing Team to return to Moto2, having previously competed in the championship in 2014 as "Caterham Moto Racing Team".
 Kiefer Racing downsized to one bike in 2018 due to financial issues. Sandro Cortese, who was originally contracted to ride the team's second bike, was later released as a result.

Calendar
The following Grands Prix were scheduled to take place in 2018:

 ‡ = Night race

Calendar changes

 The British Grand Prix was scheduled to move from Silverstone to the new Circuit of Wales, but construction on the new track has not commenced. The two circuits reached a deal that will see Silverstone with an option to host the 2018 race.
The Thailand Grand Prix is a new addition to the calendar, with the race scheduled for 7 October.
The Catalan Grand Prix used a new configuration of the Circuit de Barcelona-Catalunya, wherein the previous set of corners of turns 13, 14 and 15 was combined into a sweeping right corner. The new layout was previously used in Formula 1 from 2004 to 2006.

Results and standings

Grands Prix

Riders' standings
Scoring system
Points were awarded to the top fifteen finishers. A rider had to finish the race to earn points.

Constructors' standings
Scoring system
Points were awarded to the top fifteen finishers. A rider had to finish the race to earn points.

 Each constructor got the same number of points as their best placed rider in each race.

Teams' standings
The teams' standings were based on results obtained by regular and substitute riders; wild-card entries were ineligible.

Notes

References

Moto2
Grand Prix motorcycle racing seasons